County Road 318 may refer to:

County Road 318 (Flagler County, Florida), now County Road 2006
County Road 318 (Levy County, Florida), formerly State Road 318
County Road 318A (Levy County, Florida)
County Road 318 (Marion County, Florida), formerly State Road 318
 County Route 318 (Wayne County, New York)